Echinopsis arachnacantha (syn. Lobivia arachnacantha) is a species of cactus in the genus Echinopsis, native to Bolivia. It has gained the Royal Horticultural Society's Award of Garden Merit.

Subtaxa
The following subspecies are accepted:
Echinopsis arachnacantha subsp. arachnacantha
Echinopsis arachnacantha subsp. densiseta (Rausch) M.Lowry
Echinopsis arachnacantha subsp. sulphurea (R.Vásquez) M.Lowry
Echinopsis arachnacantha subsp. torrecillasensis (Cárdenas) M.Lowry

References

arachnacantha
Endemic flora of Bolivia
Plants described in 1974